The Lady in Red may refer to:

Music 
 "The Lady in Red" (Chris de Burgh song), released in 1986
 "The Lady in Red" (Allie Wrubel song), released in 1935

Film 
 The Lady in Red (1935 film), a Warner Bros. cartoon
 The Lady in Red (1979 film), directed by Lewis Teague

Other uses 
 Lady in Red (ghost), a type of female ghost attributed to a prostitute or jilted lover
 Jean Hill (1931–2000), witness to the Kennedy assassination known as the Lady in Red
 Carmen Sandiego (character), a fictional character nicknamed The Lady in Red
 one of Guertena's paintings in the 2012 video game Ib

See also 
 Red Lady (disambiguation)
 The Woman in Red (disambiguation)
 Scarlet woman (disambiguation)
 The Woman in the Red Dress, a minor character in the movie The Matrix
 Women in Red, a Wikiproject to create new articles about notable women